PCMark is a computer benchmark tool developed by UL (formerly Futuremark) to test the performance of a PC at the system and component level. In most cases, the tests in PCMark are designed to represent typical home user workloads.  Running PCMark produces a score with higher numbers indicating better performance. Several versions of PCMark have been released. Scores cannot be compared across versions since each includes different tests.

Versions

Controversy
In a 2008 Ars Technica article, a VIA Nano gained significant performance after its CPUID changed to Intel. This was because Intel compilers create conditional code that uses more advanced instructions for CPUs that identify as Intel.

See also 
 Benchmark (computing)
 3DMark
 Futuremark

References

External links 
 PCMark benchmarks
 Unsupported PCMark benchmarks (PCMark2002 - 7)
 UL Benchmarks

Benchmarks (computing)
Software developed in Finland